WMYL (96.7 FM, "96.7 Merle") is a radio station broadcasting the country music format. Licensed to Halls Crossroads, Tennessee, United States, the station serves the Knoxville area. Forgotten Favorites and only the New Country you LOVE. The station is currently owned and operated by Ron Meredith M & M Broadcasting.

In 2006, Ron Meredith and M&M Broadcasting purchased WXJB, WFXY, and WANO in Middlesboro, KY, Harrogate, TN, and Pineville, KY, for just over 1 million dollars, changed the call letters to of WXJB to WMYL, and branded the station as Merle FM, moving it Knoxville and Halls Crossroads, to which it is licensed. The station is now branded "96.7 Merle. Forgotten favorites and only the new country you love."

Since moving on to Halls Crossroads, 96.7 Merle has offered a mix of old and new country and is wildly successful in East Tennessee.

The station is home to multiple CMA Personality Of The Year award winners, including morning show Bud and Broadway, afternoon talent Jack Ryan, and Knoxville country legend Mike Hammond on-air at 96.7 Merle.

In spring 2020, the station revised the format to better represent country listeners in East Tennessee, playing “Your Forgotten Favorites & Only The New Country You Love.”

References

External links
 
 

Country radio stations in the United States
MYL
Knox County, Tennessee